ECAC Tournament may refer to:

ECAC Hockey Men's Ice Hockey Tournament, the collegiate conference ice hockey tournament for ECAC Hockey
ECAC Men's Basketball Tournaments, various end-of-season collegiate men's basketball tournaments organized by the Eastern College Athletic Association since 1973
ECAC North men's basketball tournament, the post-season men's basketball tournament held annually by the ECAC North Conference from 1980 through 1988, prior to it being renamed the America East Conference

See also
America East men's basketball tournament